Vocea României (English: The Voice of Romania) is a Romanian reality singing competition broadcast on PRO TV. Based on the original The Voice of Holland, the concept of the series is to find new singing talent contested by aspiring singers, age 16 or over, drawn from public auditions. The winner is determined by television viewers voting by telephone and he is entitled to a €100,000 prize and a record deal with Universal Records for winning the competition. There have been ten winners of the show to date: Ștefan Stan, Julie Mayaya, Mihai Chițu, Tiberiu Albu, Cristina Bălan, Teodora Buciu, Ana Munteanu, Bogdan Ioan, Dragoș Moldovan, and Iulian Nunucă.

The Voice of Romania began airing on September 27, 2011, as an autumn TV season program. The series employs a panel of four coaches who critique the artists' performances. Each coach guides their teams of selected artists through the remainder of the season. They also compete to ensure that their act wins the competition, thus making them the winning coach. The original coaching panel consisted of Smiley, Horia Brenciu, Loredana Groza and Marius Moga. In season four, Brenciu was replaced by Tudor Chirilă. In season seven, Moga was replaced by Adrian Despot. In season eight, Loredana and Despot were replaced by Irina Rimes and Andra. In season nine, Brenciu returned as a coach, replacing Andra. In season ten, Brenciu was replaced by The Motans, while Smiley will be in a duo with Theo Rose.

Format 

One of the important premises of the show is the quality of the singing talent. Four coaches, themselves popular performing artists, train the talents in their group and occasionally perform with them. Talents are selected in blind auditions, where the coaches cannot see, but only hear the auditioner.

The series consists of four phases:

 Blind audition;
 Battle round;
 Knockout stage;
 Live performance shows.

Blind audition 
Four judges/coaches, all famous musicians, will choose teams of 12, 14 or 16 contestants each through a four-episode-long blind audition process. Each judge has the length of the auditionee's performance to decide if he or she wants that singer on his or her team; if two or more judges want the same singer then the singer gets to choose which coach they want to work with. In the 8th season, a new twist called "Block" is featured, which allows one coach to block another coach from getting a contestant.

Battle round 
Each team of singers is mentored and developed by its respective coach. In the second stage, called the battle phase, coaches have two of their team members battle against each other directly by singing the same song together, with the coach choosing which team member to advance from each of six individual "battles". In the first three seasons, at the end of the battle phase, there is a sing-off between two contestants of each coach, singing their audition songs. The coach chooses which one of them will join the other artists into the first live round. Within that first live round, the surviving acts from each team again compete head-to-head, with a combination of public and jury vote deciding who advances onto the next round. A new element was added in season three; coaches were given two "steals", allowing each coach to select two individuals who were eliminated during a battle round by another coach.

Knockout stage 
The third stage of the competition is the 'Knockout stage'. It was first introduced in the sixth series (2016). The four coaches will enter this stage with nine team members each; eight winners of the battle phase, and two stolen members. Artists perform a 'killer song' of their choosing and the coaches each pick three members of their team to go through to the live shows, creating a final 12 for the public vote.

Live performance shows 
The final stage, 'Live shows', is where the artists perform in front of the coaches and an audience, broadcast live. Each coach will have four artists in their team to begin with and the artists will go head-to-head in the competition to win the public votes. These will determine which artist advances to the final eight. The remaining three artists' future in the show will be determined by the coaches, choosing who will progress.

The final eight artists will compete in a live broadcast. However, the coaches will have a 50/50 say with the audience and the public in deciding which artists move on to the 'final four' phase. In the latter, each coach will have one member who will continue. In season four, the proportion was changed to 40/60. Season five changed the system completely and introduced "crossed duels": each of the eight contestants battles one from another team. The winner qualifies for the final. This opens the possibility of coaches ending up with 0, 1 or 2 contestants in the final

The final (the winner round) will be decided upon by the public vote.

Host and coaches

Host 
Pavel Bartoș has hosted the series since the inaugural season. Roxana Ionescu was co-host in season one but she was replaced by singer and actress Nicoleta Luciu. Vlad Roșca serve as the original "backstage, online and social media correspondent". In seasons four and five, Roșca was replaced by Oana Tache. Tache was replaced by Lili Sandu, starting with season six. In season eight, Irina Fodor replaced Lili Sandu as the social media correspondent, while Laura Giurcanu became the vlogger of the show.

Coaches 
In August 2011 pop singer and actress Loredana, R'n'B musician and composer Marius Moga, singer and TV host Horia Brenciu and former Simplu member Smiley were confirmed coaches for the Voice of Romania.  In season four, Brenciu was replaced with Vama lead member, Tudor Chirilă. In season seven, Moga was replaced with Vița de Vie lead member Adrian Despot. In season eight, Loredana and Despot were replaced by Irina Rimes and Andra. In season nine, Brenciu returned as a coach replacing Andra.In season ten, Brenciu was replaced by The Motans soloist Denis Roabeṣ, while Smiley will form a duo with Theo Rose.

Timeline of coaches

Series overview 
Warning: the following table presents a significant amount of different colors.

Season synopses 
Names in bold type indicate the winner of the season.

Season 1 

The first season of The Voice of Romania premiered on September 27, 2011. and concluded on 26 December. The Judges were pop singer and actress Loredana Groza, R'n'B musician and composer Marius Moga, singer and TV host Horia Brenciu and former Simplu member Smiley. Pavel Bartoș with Roxana Ionescu and Vlad Roșca respectively appeared as the hosts and social media correspondent. Contestant auditions were held in Cluj-Napoca, Timișoara, Iași, Brașov and Bucharest during April and May.

Each coach was allowed to advance five contestants to the live shows:

Four contestants were advanced to the final round. Stan was announced as the winner of the season, while Chircu was declared the runner-up. Third and fourth places were a draw between Pușchilă and Sanda. Stan won by 37.67% of the votes.

Season 2 

The Voice of Romania returned to Pro TV for a second season which began on September 25, 2012. All four coaches are returning for season two, while Co-presenter Roxana Ionescu was replaced with singer and actress Nicoleta Luciu. The second season ended on December 26, 2011. Contestant auditions were held in Cluj-Napoca, Timișoara, Iași, Brașov and Bucharest during 4–29 June.

Each coach was allowed to advance six contestants to the live shows:

Four contestants were advanced to the final round. Mayaya was announced as the winner of the season, while Vízi, Nistor, and Scobiola placed second, third, and fourth, respectively.

Season 3 

The third season of Vocea României premiered on September 28, 2013, and concluded on December 26. All personnel returned from the previous season. A new element was added in season three; coaches were given two "steals", allowing each coach to select two individuals who were eliminated during a battle round by another coach. Contestant auditions were held in Cluj-Napoca, Timișoara, Iași, Brașov and Bucharest during April and May.

Each coach was allowed to advance eight contestants to the live shows:

Four contestants were advanced to the final round. Chițu was announced as the winner of the season, while Niculae, Nour, and Marin placed second, third, and fourth, respectively.

Season 4 

The fourth season of Vocea României premiered on September 16, 2014, and concluded on December 19. In this season, Brenciu was replaced with Vama lead member, Tudor Chirilă and Roșca was replaced by Oana Tache. Contestant auditions were held in Cluj-Napoca, Timișoara, Iași, Brașov and Bucharest during June and July.

Each coach was allowed to advance eight contestants to the live shows:

Four contestants were advanced to the final round. Albu was announced as the winner of the season, while Dimitriu, Hojda, and Moon placed second, third, and fourth, respectively.

Season 5 

The fifth season of Vocea României premiered on September 18, 2015. All personnel returned from the previous season. Contestant auditions were held in Cluj-Napoca, Timișoara, Iași, Brașov and Bucharest during May and June.

Each coach was allowed to advance eight contestants to the live shows:

The season finale aired on December 18, 2015. Team Tudor and Team Moga had one finalist each, while Team Smiley had two. Both semi-finalists in Team Loredana had been eliminated. Cristina Bălan, best known as the lead vocalist of the bands Impact and ABCD and mentored by Tudor Chirilă, was declared winner of the season. It was Chirilă's second consecutive victory as a coach.

Season 6 

The sixth season of Vocea României premiered on September 9, 2016. All personnel returned from the previous season. Contestant auditions were held in Cluj-Napoca, Timișoara, Iași, Brașov and Bucharest during March and April.

Each coach was allowed to advance three contestants to the live shows:

The season finale aired on December 16, 2016. Team Smiley and Team Moga had one finalist each, while Team Tudor had two. For the second consecutive times, Loredana did not have any artist in final show. Teodora Buciu, mentored by Tudor Chirilă, was declared winner of the season. It was Chirilă's third consecutive victory as a coach.

Season 7 

The seventh season of Vocea României premiered on September 8, 2017. In this season, Moga was replaced with Vița de Vie lead member, Adrian Despot. Contestant auditions were held in Cluj-Napoca, Timișoara, Iași and Bucharest during February, May and June.

The season finale aired on December 15, 2017. Four contestants were advanced to the final round, one from each team. Munteanu was announced as the winner of the season, while Ndubuisi, Cerveni, and Crețu placed second, third, and fourth, respectively.

Season 8 

The eighth season of Vocea României premiered on September 7, 2018. In this season, Groza and Despot was replaced with Rimes and Andra. Contestant auditions were held in Cluj-Napoca, Timișoara, Iași and Bucharest during March and February.

The season finale aired on December 14, 2018. Four contestants were advanced to the final round, one from each team. Ioan was announced as the winner of the season, while Gaitanovici, Boiangiu, and Coca placed second, third, and fourth, respectively.

Season 9 

The ninth season of Vocea României premiered in September 2019. In this season, Andra was replaced by Brenciu, who last coached in season 3. Contestant auditions were held in Cluj-Napoca, Timișoara, Iași and Bucharest during March and April.

The season finale aired on December 20, 2019. Four contestants were advanced to the final round, one from each team. Moldovan was announced as the winner of the season, while Țolea, Răsădean, and Bozian placed second, third, and fourth, respectively.

"Reuniunea" 

Due to the COVID-19 pandemic, the show did not return in the fall of 2020, as usual. Instead, on Romania's National Day, a reunion special took place. The special featured all of the show's coaches so far (except for Loredana Groza, who is under contract with the rival television, Antena 1) and some of the contestants and winners.

Season 10 

The tenth season of Vocea României premiered on September 9, 2022, after 2 years of absence due to the COVID-19 pandemic. In this season, Horia Brenciu was replaced by Denis 'The Motans', while Smiley was joined by Theo Rose, in a duo. Contestant auditions were held in Cluj-Napoca, Timișoara, Iași and Bucharest during March and April.

Ratings

Music

The Voice of Romania Album 

The Voice of Romania album is the first compilation album by the finalists from the first three seasons. It was released digitally on December 18, 2014.

Awards and nominations

See also 
 The Voice (TV series)
 List of Romanian television series

References

External links 
Official website

Romanian television series
2011 Romanian television series debuts
Pro TV original programming